The Aflame EP is an EP by the Dark ambient band Black Tape for a Blue Girl. It was released in 1998 by Projekt Records.

Track listing
"As One Aflame Laid Bare by Desire"
"Dulcinea"
"On Broken Shells of Crystal Dreams"
"Could I Stay the Honest One?"

Sources

Black Tape for a Blue Girl albums
1998 EPs
Projekt Records EPs